Bill Flanagan (born 1955) is an American author, television executive and radio host.

Bill Flanagan may also refer to:
 Bill Flanagan (academic), Canadian academic
 Bill Flanagan (rugby league), Australian rugby league player
 Bill Flanagan (American football) (1901–1935), American football player

See also
 William Flanagan (disambiguation)